Alberto Pozzi (21 November 1902 – 1966) was an Italian footballer who played as a forward. He represented the Italy national football team three times, the first being on 3 December 1922, the occasion of a friendly match against Switzerland in a 2–2 home draw.

Honours

Player
Bologna
Italian Football Championship: 1924–25, 1928–29

References

1902 births
1966 deaths
Italian footballers
Italy international footballers
Association football forwards
Bologna F.C. 1909 players